Pradosia kuhlmannii is a species of plant in the family Sapotaceae. It is endemic to Brazil.  It is threatened by habitat loss.

Taxonomy 
Pradosia grisebachii and Ecclinusa grisebachii are synonyms for this species.

References

Flora of Brazil
kuhlmannii
Endangered plants
Taxonomy articles created by Polbot